Kazanka is a rural locality (a village) in Mukasovsky Selsoviet, Baymaksky District, Bashkortostan, Russia. The population was 417 as of 2010. There are 4  streets.

Geography 
Kazanka is located 46 km northeast of Baymak (the district's administrative centre) by road. Sibay is the nearest rural locality.

References 

Rural localities in Baymaksky District